The Parish of Sutherland is one of the 57 parishes in Cumberland County, New South Wales, a cadastral unit for use on land titles. It was originally proclaimed as the parish of Southerland with an 'o', but was misspelled without it on the government gazette. It includes all of the Kurnell peninsula, with Botany Bay and the Georges River to the north; part of the Woronora River to the west; and Port Hacking to the south. Suburbs within the parish include Cronulla, Miranda, Woolooware, Caringbah, Gymea, Sutherland, Sylvania Waters and Oyster Bay.

References

 Sutherland shire placenames
 Parish map of Sutherland, NSW Department of Lands
 

Parishes of Cumberland County